The Kapauri–Sause (Kapori–Sause) languages form a small language family spoken along the middle Taritatu River in the Jayapura Regency of Papua, Indonesia. They are two languages, Kapauri (Kapori) and Sause, which are not particularly close.

Classification
There is a history of linking at least Kapauri to the Kaure languages (see Kaure–Kapori languages). However, they show no particular affiliation, and Kapauri appears to be closer to Kwerba. Usher demonstrated a connection instead with another erstwhile isolate, Sause, together forming a branch of Kwerbic.
A partial reconstruction of proto-Kapauri–Sause can be found there.

Proto-language

Phonemes
Usher (2020) reconstructs the consonant inventory as follows. Apparent gaps may be due to poverty of data (e.g., there are /p/, /ɸ/ and /ɡ/ in the languages, but as of 2020 they have not been reconstructed for the protolanguage):

{| 
| *m || *n ||  ||  ||
|-
|  || *t || *s || *k || 
|-
| *b ||  ||  || || 
|-
| *w || *ɽ || *j ||  || *h
|}

{| 
| *i ||  || *u
|-
| *e || *ɵ || *o
|-
| *ɛ ||  || 
|-
| || colspan=2|*a [*aː] 
|}

Pronouns
Pronouns are reconstructed as follow.

Basic vocabulary
Some lexical reconstructions by Usher (2020) are:

{| class="wikitable sortable"
! gloss !! Proto-Kapauri-Sause
|-
| head || *baːɽ
|-
| ear || *t[o̝/u]waro̝
|-
| tooth || *w₂ano̝
|-
| tongue || *mɛn₂o̝
|-
| blood || *ko̝mo̝
|-
| bone || *aːᵘC
|-
| breast || *mɵ̝N
|-
| louse || *hɛno̝
|-
| dog || *unu
|-
| bird || *ɽe̝Cne̝N
|-
| egg || *huwini
|-
| sun || *nisiki (?)
|-
| moon || *bɛ[N/nV]
|-
| water/river || *bo̝C
|-
| path || *nawaɽo̝
|-
| eat || *na[N/nV]
|-
| two || *nɛbɽe̝[na]
|}

References

External links 
 Timothy Usher, New Guinea World, Proto-Kapauri–Sause

 
Languages of Indonesia
Kwerbic languages